The Glen River (in French: rivière Glen) is a tributary of the west bank of the Chaudière River which flows north to empty onto the south bank of the St. Lawrence River.

The Glen River flows through the municipalities of Nantes and Sainte-Cécile-de-Whitton, in the Le Granit Regional County Municipality, in the administrative region of Estrie, in Quebec, in Canada.

Toponymy 
The toponym Glen River was formalized on October 19, 1971, at the Commission de toponymie du Québec.

See also 

 List of rivers of Quebec

References 

Rivers of Estrie
Le Granit Regional County Municipality